Xanthaciura bipuncta is a species of tephritid or fruit flies in the genus Xanthaciura of the family Tephritidae.

Distribution
Argentina.

References

Tephritinae
Insects described in 1953
Diptera of South America